Prays temulenta is a moth in the  family Plutellidae.

External links
 Prays temulenta at www.catalogueoflife.org.

Plutellidae
Moths described in 1910